Rockwell Place is an unincorporated area and census-designated place (CDP) in Randall County, Texas, United States. It was first listed as a CDP prior to the 2020 census.

It is north of the center of the county, on the east side of Interstate 27. It is bordered to the south by Canyon, the county seat.

References 

Populated places in Randall County, Texas
Census-designated places in Randall County, Texas
Census-designated places in Texas